Iharkutosuchus ("Iharkút crocodile", after where it was found) is an extinct genus of basal eusuchian crocodyliform. Its fossils have been found in the Santonian-age Upper Cretaceous Csehbánya Formation in the Bakony Mountains of western Hungary.

Description
It is based on MTM 2006.52.1, a nearly complete skull, and several other partial skulls, isolated skull bones, and numerous teeth are also known. Iharkutosuchus was a small crocodyliform (skull length , estimated body length ). Its skull was low, and the snout was short. Iharkutosuchus is unusual in its heterodonty: some of its teeth were complex and multicusped, like mammal teeth. The structure of the skull indicates that it could grind food with a mobile lower jaw, and together with the teeth suggest a diet of fibrous plant material.

Classification
The genus was described in 2007 by Attila Ősi and colleagues. The type species is I. makadii, named for László Makádi. A 2011 phylogenetic study recovered Iharkutosuchus as a member of Hylaeochampsidae, a group of basal eusuchians, as shown in the cladogram below.

References

Late Cretaceous crocodylomorphs of Europe
Late Cretaceous reptiles of Europe
Neosuchians
Prehistoric pseudosuchian genera